Star Wars Tales is a comic book series published by Dark Horse Comics, beginning on September 29, 1999, and completing its run on July 13, 2005. Each issue is 64 pages and features a few unrelated stories from various eras of the Star Wars timeline. Stories from issues #1–20 were retroactively labelled "Infinities", placing them outside the Star Wars canon, while those of issues #21–24 were considered to be within continuity, unless labelled otherwise. References to the stories were made within the Expanded Universe, the entirety of which was deemed non-canon by Lucasfilm in 2014.

The entire series was collected into six trade paperbacks, comprising four issues each.

Issues and their canonicity

Volume 1

Issue #1

Life, Death, and the Living Force 

 Script: Jim Woodring
 Pencils: Robert Teranishi
 Colors: Christopher Chuckry
 14 pages
 Galactic Year: 33 BBY
 Preceded by: A Summer's Dream
 Followed by: Incident at Horn Station

Mara Jade: A Night on the Town 

 Script: Timothy Zahn
 Pencils: Igor Kordey
 Colors: Keith Wood
 16 Pages
 Galactic Year: 5 ABY
 Preceded by: Supply and Demand
 Followed by: Marooned

Darth Vader: Extinction (Part 1) 

 Script: Ron Marz
 Pencils: Claudio Castellini
 Colors: Guy Major
 16 Pages
 Galactic Year: 1 BBY
 Preceded by: Underworld: The Yavin Vassilika
 Followed by: Darth Vader: Extinction (Part 2)

Skippy the Jedi Droid 

 Script: Peter David
 Pencils: Martin Egeland
 Inks: Howard S. Shum

 Colors: Harold MacKinnon
 8 Pages
 Galactic Year: 0 ABY
 Preceded by: X-Wing Rogue Squadron #1/2
 Followed by: Resurrection

Issue #2

Routine 

 Script: Tony Isabella
 Pencils: John Nadeau
 Colors: Dave Nestelle
 8 Pages
 Galactic Year: 5 BBY
 Preceded by: Luke Skywalker: Walkabout
 Followed by: Young Lando Calrissian

Han Solo and Chewbacca, flying the Jaina's Light (named after Han's mother), are stopped by the Vigilant, an Imperial ship. A Level One inspection is performed on Jaina's Light, but the Imperial Captain Deyd Llnewe and Lieutenant Raprice find nothing. This happens two more times, with the inspection being more intensive each time, Llnewe being convinced that Solo is up to something. After the third unsuccessful inspection, Han and Chewie are sent on their way, when Captain Llnewe suddenly realizes that the ships Solo was piloting were different each time; Han was not smuggling spice or some other illegal substance, but ships. Deyd orders his gunners to fire on Han, but he was long gone by then.

Darth Vader: Extinction (Part 2) 

 Script: Ron Marz
 Pencils: Claudio Castellini
 Inks: Jason Hvam
 Colors: Guy Major
 16 Pages
 Galactic Year: 1 BBY
 Preceded by: Darth Vader: Extinction (Part 1)
 Followed by: The Hovel on Terk Street

Stop That Jawa! 

 Story & Art: Dave Cooper
 8 Pages
 Galactic Year: 3 ABY
 Preceded by: Skreej
 Followed by: A Hot Time in the Cold Town Tonite

Incident at Horn Station 

 Script: Dan Jolley
 Pencils: Sean Phillips
 Colors: Matthew Hollingsworth
 18 Pages
 Galactic Year: 33 BBY
 Preceded by: Life, Death, and the Living Force
 Followed by: Prelude to Rebellion

Issue #3

The Death of Captain Tarpals 

 Script: Ryder Windham
 Pencils: Tom Fowler
 Colors: Dave Nestelle
 8 Pages
 Galactic Year: 32.5 BBY
 Preceded by: Darth Maul
 Followed by: Episode 1: The Phantom Menace

In the Gungan city of Otoh Gunga, Chef Marshoo catches Jar Jar Binks in the kitchen trying to scavenge leftovers. Marshoo prepares to punch Binks just as Captain Roos Tarpals comes in to arrest Binks for the very same thing. He puts the handcuffs on Binks and takes him away. Soon after, Tarpals tells Binks that everyone down at the station is calling him "The Death of Captain Tarpals." Suddenly Tarpals is ambushed by Marshoo and some of his friends, who prepare to beat down Binks as they'd planned. They throw a frying pan at Binks, but he ducks, and it goes flying into his kaadu, who retaliates with a kick to Marshoo, sending him and his cohorts into a small fountain. Binks revives Tarpals, and asks to be released after taking care of Marshoo. Roos ignores him and takes him to the surface of Naboo, where he shall live for a long time to come.

Deal with a Demon 

 Script: John Ostrander
 Pencils: Jan Duursema
 Inks: Rick Magyar
 Colors: Dan Jackson
 10 Pages
 Galactic Year: 32 BBY
 Preceded by: Outlander
 Followed by: Force Fiction

Vilmarh Grahrk has been hired by the people of Ootoola (who he fondly refers to as "fishfaces") to smuggle Princess Foolookoola off-planet; she is currently being hunted down by the purists of Ootoola, who previously killed the patriarch and his wife, seizing power of the planet. He and Naradan D'ulin, the caretaker of the princess, begin taking her to Villie's ship, when they're suddenly ambushed by a group of Ootoola purists. Villie hands the princess over, telling Naradan that the purists offered more credits than the loyalists did. Naradan and the princess are taken away and put into the purists' prison.

That night, Villie blows open the prison door and rescues them, only to get a punch in the face from Naradan. Vilmarh explains that before, with the princess running loose, everybody was looking for her, but now that they've assumed she's still locked up, nobody will be trying to find her. Naradan grabs a rifle in case she decides to shoot him, and they head out. They spot a couple of guards, and Villie casually walks up to them, steals one of their blasters, and shoots both of them. Villie, Naradan and the princess quickly escape the palace and head to Vilmarh's ship, the Inferno, where they are vocally greeted by NT. They fly off, Villie destroying the palace on his way up. They make their way to the planet Dur Sabon, where Foolookoola is to live her life among the Dur Sabon until she can return to Ootoola.

Lady Luck 

 Script: Rich Handley & Darko Macan
 Pencils: Chris Brunner
 Colors: Michelle Madgen & Dave Stewart
 16 Pages
 Galactic Year: 1 ABY
 Preceded by: My Brother, My Enemy
 Followed by: Dark Lord's Conscience

Three Against the Galaxy 

 Script: Rich Hedden
 Pencils: Rick Leonardi
 Inks: Mark Lipka
 Colors: Dave McCaig
 22 Pages
 Galactic Year: 5 ABY
 Preceded by: Marooned
 Followed by: Boba Fett: Agent of Doom

Issue #4

Moment of Doubt 

 Script: Lovern Kindzierski
 Pencils: Robert Teranishi
 Colors: Dave McCaig
 14 Pages
 Galactic Year: 3 ABY
 Preceded by: Duel a Dark Lord
 Followed by: Hoth

The story takes place 3 A.B.Y. Awarru Tark arrives aboard the Star Destroyer Avenger in a YT-1300 freighter, answering Darth Vader's call for bounty hunters to find the Millennium Falcon. When he meets with Vader he immediately launches a vicious assault on the Sith Lord with Grenades and light blades that extend from his arms.

As Vader reaches into Tark's mind he finds Awarru Tark is actually Stauz Czycz. Czycz underwent a surgical transformation to implant a force field generator into his body, so that he could attack Vader as revenge, having lost his own family in an Imperial assault on his homeworld.

Using telekinesis to disable the generator, Vader decapitates Czycz, leaving him to consider Czycz's status as more machine than man.

A Death Star is Born 

 Script: Kevin Rubio
 Pencils: Lucas Marangon
 Colors: Dave Nestelle
 12 Pages
 Galactic Year: 2 BBY
 Preceded by: The Black Cavern
 Followed by: Han Solo At Stars' End

Moff Wilhuff Tarkin, Tol Sivron, and Bevel Lemelisk submit their Death Star proposal to Emperor Palpatine and Darth Vader. The perceived flaws of the schematics are humorously discussed. The appearance of Bevel Lemelisk is different in this comic than in any other source where he is portrayed. This was an intentional choice on behalf of the comic's creator, although for unknown reasons. One should also note the presence of Ackbar, a Mon Calamari, and Grand Moff Tarkin's slave, soon to be Rebel Alliance Admiral listening in through the door.

Several references in the story allude to popular culture, including the following:

 The Imperial insignia, reminiscent of Mickey Mouse-ears;
 A "Bob's Big Boy" fast food chain statue;
 A hologram of Yogi Bear;
 The starship from the Star Trek series known as Starship Enterprise.
 The Beatles' Yellow Submarine

Spare Parts 

 Script: Mark Evanier & Sergio Aragonés
 Pencils: Sergio Aragonés
 Colors: Tom Luth
 4 Pages
 Galactic Year: 22 ABY
 Preceded by: Union
 Followed by: Chewbacca

Sand Blasted 

 Story & Art: Kilian Plunkett
 Colors: Dave Nestelle
 28 Pages
 Galactic Year: 4 ABY
 Preceded by: The Jabba Tape
 Followed by: A Day in the Life

Volume 2

Issue #5

Yaddle's Tale: The One Below 

 Script: Dean Motter
 Pencils: Jesus Saiz
 Inks: Fernando Blanco
 Colors: Dave Nestelle
 16 Pages
 Galactic Year: 245 BBY
 Preceded by: Heart of Darkness
 Followed by: Vow of Justice

Whilst discussing the possibility of knighting Yaddle the Jedi Council revisit the story of her training under the tutelage of Polvin Kut, two-hundred years prior.

On a mission to liberate the colonies of the Advozse Warlock Tulak the duo are betrayed on Koba, leading to Kut's death. The Padawan Yaddle is taken hostage by the Warlock but is impervious to his interrogations, warning him 'Rule by terror you do, die by fear you will'.

In time Tulak tires of the colony and leaves Koba. However, he seals Yaddle in a pit with the hope that he can use her as a future bargaining tool but she is soon forgotten. She is confined for a century, surviving on food and water provided by wardens left behind when Tulak left. Over the generations, the Koba society collapses, though the primitives still tend to her, lowering food as part of a ritual they barely understand. She is spoken of as The One Below. During this time Yaddle hones her Jedi skills.

Eventually an earthquake brings down the roof of her pit, allowing her to escape. Seeing the destruction of the nearby village she remains on the planet to aid the Kobans. She dedicates herself to teaching the children, society rebuilds around her. She is quietly content with her work until the day Kalut, Tulak's son, returns to Koba claiming it as his heirloom. He casually attacks, slaying many and deciding what, if anything to take, Forced to fight, Kulat ends up speared on his own weapon and dies.

On hearing the story the Jedi Council, in particular Yoda, are swayed to initiate her as a Jedi Master.

What They Called Me 

 Story & Art: Craig Thompson
 4 Pages
 This story is non-canon

A Summer's Dream 

 Script: Terry Moore
 Pencils: Cliff Richards
 Inks: P. Craig Russell
 Colors: Matt Hollingsworth
 12 Pages
 Galactic Year: 33 BBY
 Preceded by: Jedi Council: Acts of War
 Followed by: Life, Death, and the Living Force

Hoth 

 Story & Art: Tony Millionaire
 Colors: Michelle Madsen
 2 Pages
 Galactic Year: 3 ABY
 Preceded by: Moment of Doubt
 Followed by: Slippery Slope

An encounter on the frozen ice fields.

Lando's Commandos: On Eagle's Wings 

 Script: Ian Edginton
 Pencils: Carlos Meglia
 Colors: Michelle Madsen
 22 Pages
 Galactic Year: 4 ABY
 Preceded by: Problem Solvers
 Followed by: The Thrawn trilogy

A series of devastating pirate raids are costing the Rebellion dozens of lost lives, tons of equipment and ships and their credibility in the eyes of other forces. Lando is tasked to lead a mission to destroy the pirates. Among his people, the man who taught the pirates everything they know!

Issue #6

The Hovel on Terk Street 

 Script: Tom Fassbender & Jom Pascoe
 Pencils: Eric Powell
 Inks: Drew Geraci & Keith Barnett
 Colors: Dave Stewart
 12 Pages
 Galactic Year: 1 BBY
 Preceded by: Extinction
 Followed by: Rookies Rendezvous

The Max Rebo Band in "A Hot Time in the Cold Town Tonite!" 

 Script: Ian Edginton
 Pencils: Mark Martin & Rick Neilsen
 7 Pages
 Galactic Year: 3 ABY
 Preceded by: Stop that Jawa!
 Followed by: The One That Got Away

Fortune, Fate, and the Natural History of the Sarlacc 

 Script: Mark Schultz
 Pencils: Kellie Strom
 9 Pages
 Galactic Year: 12 BBY
 Preceded by: Ghost
 Followed by: Nerf Herder

Junkheap Hero 

 Script: Mark Evanier
 Pencils: Sergio Aragonés
 Colors: Dave McCaig
 5 Pages
 Galactic Year: 2 ABY
 Preceded by: Lucky Stars
 Followed by: River of Chaos

The Hidden 

 Script: Sean Konot & Scott Morse
 Pencils: Scott Morse
 7 Pages
 Galactic Year: 2 ABY
 Preceded by: A Valentine's Story: Breaking the Ice
 Followed by: Lunch Break

Thank the Maker 

 Script: Ryder Windham
 Pencils: Kilian Plunkett
 Colors: Dave McCaig
 9 Pages
 Galactic Year: 3 ABY
 Preceded by: Slippery Slope
 Followed by: Hunger Pains

Issue #7

Single Cell 

 Script: Haden Blackman
 Pencils: Jan Duursema
 Inks: Ray Kryssing
 Colors: Dave McCaig
 12 Pages
 Galactic Year: 32.5 BBY
 Preceded by: Prelude to Rebellion
 Followed by: Darth Maul

Aboard the Trade Federation battleship Stockade, the incarcerated Feeorin Nym recounts the story of how he got there to his Neimoidian cellmate ...

In orbit around Maramere in the Havoc, Nym, Kole and Jinkins waited for the mercenary Vana Sage and her 'buyers' (a group of high class bounty hunters) to trade experimental weapons for Stygium crystals.

Once on board the space station, Nym and his crew met the buyers to exchange goods. When Nym revealed that he had buried the power cells for the weapons as a safeguard, a fight ensues between the crew of the Havoc and the bounty hunters.

Under the threat of Droidekas, Sage captured the crew, sent Kole and Jinkins to Maramere in an escape pod, and took the Havoc as payment for delivering Nym to the Trade Federation.

Back in the cell, Merick and Bravo arrive to torture Nym who vows revenge on Vana Sage.

Nerf Herder 

 Script: Phil Amara
 Pencils: Francisco Hererra
 Inks: Howard M. Shum
 Colors: Michelle Madsen
 10 Pages
 Galactic Year: 11 BBY
 Preceded by: Fortune, Fate, and the Natural History of the Sarlacc
 Followed by: Luke Skywalker: Detective

Jedi Chef (or Pizza Hutt) 

 Script: Randy Stradley
 Art: Francisco Ruiz Velasco
 8 Pages
 Galactic Year: 34 BBY
 Preceded by: Qui-Gon and Obi-Wan: Last Stand on Ord Mantell
 Followed by: Nameless

Jedi Council members Micah Giiett and Plo Koon embark on a mission to planet Ord Mantell, to rescue famous chef Slabba Drewl from Corpo the Hutt. Apparently Drewl was enslaved to Corpo after losing a bet with the Hutt.

Corpo's priorities in life were gambling and food, and his prize possession was a MREM-02 kitchen droid, called Moreemohtwo. Giett bets Corpo that he can prepare a meal better than one made by Moreemohtwo. Corpo accepts the wager - if Giiett wins, Drewl is freed. If Moreemohtwo wins, then Giiett would also become enslaved to the Hutt.

Giiett secretly instructs Plo Koon to "sabotage" the meal prepared by the droid. The "cook-off" begins, with a host announcing the theme ingredient: Denusian squirmers. Giiett is bitten on the nose by a squirmer, and he uses his lightsaber to power-chop and flash cook the theme ingredient. Meanwhile, Plo Koon sneakily replaces Moreemohtwo's seebo sauce with droid oil, and slips gundar droppings, Rakririan burnout sauce and Bothan foot powder into Moreemohtwo's pot.

At the end of the cook-off, Moreemohtwo presents 5 dishes of delicious looking food, while Giett presents his two messy bowls of squirmer stew. After Corpo tastes Moreemohtwo's sabotaged meal, Corpo immediately releases Drewl from custody.

Outbid But Never Outgunned 

 Script: Beau Smith
 Pencils: Mike Deodato Jr.
 Inks: Neil Nelson
 Colors: Dave McCaig
 16 Pages
 Galactic Year: 6 BBY
 Preceded by: The Princess Leia Diaries (pages 1–7)
 Followed by: Luke Skywalker: Walkabout

Force Fiction 

 Script: Kevin Rubio
 Art: Lucas Marangon
 Colors: Michelle Madsen
 10 Pages
 Galactic Year: 32 BBY
 Preceded by: Deal with a Demon
 Followed by: Nomad, Chapter one

Mace Windu and Yoda debate the possibility of training Anakin Skywalker while eating at a fast food restaurant, resorting to food-based analogies to make their points. At one point, Yoda uses his mind control powers on the waitress to make the meal free, to protect them from "high prices." They also fend off a robbery. At the end of the story, Supreme Chancellor Palpatine joins them and expresses his opinion that Skywalker would make a fine Jedi.

Issue #8

Captain Threepio 

 Script: Ryan Kinnaird
 Art: Ryan Kinnaird
 Letters: Jason Hvam
 Editor: Phil Amara
 6 Pages
 Galactic Year: 0 ABY
 Preceded by: Shadow Stalker
 Followed by: Classic Star Wars Volume 3: Escape to Hoth

C-3PO and R2D2 are part of the droid complement of a ship carrying technology vital to the rebellion. When an attacks kills all the humans on board, something must be done. R2D2 has a plan.

The One That Got Away 

 Script: Andi Watson
 Art: Andi Watson
 8 Pages
 Galactic Year: 3 ABY
 Preceded by: A Hot Time in the Cold Town Tonite
 Followed by: Return of the Jedi

The Secret Tales of Luke's Hand! 

 Script: Henry Gilroy
 Art: Dario Brizuela
 Colors: Cara L. Niece
 Letters: Steve Dutro
 8 Pages
 Galactic Year: 15 ABY
 Preceded by: Jedi Academy: Leviathan
 Followed by: Apocalypse Endor

To help his son Anakin go to sleep, Han Solo tells the fanciful tale of what happened to Luke Skywalker's lost hand.

Death Star Pirates 

 Script: Henry Gilroy
 Art: Glen Murakami
 Colors: Don Skinner
 20 Pages
 Galactic Year: 0 ABY
 Preceded by: Classic Star Wars Volume 3: Escape to Hoth
 Followed by: Target: Vader

One of the last ships to leave the site of the Battle of Yavin, the Millennium Falcon is caught up in a battle with a tough pirate ship. Luke Skywalker is there to lend a hand. Until he crashes into the ship's upper levels ...

Bad Business 

 Script: John Ostrander
 Pencils: Francis Portela
 Inks: Howard M. Shum
 Colors: Dave Nestelle
 Lettering: Steve Dutro
 12 Pages
 Galactic Year: 30 BBY
 Preceded by: Star Crash
 Followed by: The Hunt for Aurra Sing

Volume 3

Issue #9

Resurrection 

 Script: Ron Marz
 Pencils: Rick Leonardi
 Inks: Terry Austin
 Colors: Raul Treviño
 48 Pages
 Galactic Year: 0 ABY
 Preceded by: Skippy the Jedi Droid
 Followed by: Trooper

Lil’ Maul in: Hate Leads to Lollipops 

 Story & Art: Dave McCaig
 4 Pages
 Galactic Year: 45 BBY
 Preceded by: Survivors
 Followed by: George R. Binks

The Rebel Four 

 Story & Art: Jay Stephens
 4 Pages
 Galactic Year: 1 BBY
 Preceded by: Rookies Rendezvous: No Turning Back
 Followed by: Way of the Wookiee

Issue #10

Trooper 

 Script: Garth Ennis
 Pencils: John McCrea
 Inks: Jimmy Palmiotti
 Colors: Brad Anderson
 19 Pages
 Galactic Year: 0 ABY
 Preceded by: Resurrection
 Followed by: Smuggler's Blues

Skreej 

 Script: Mike Kennedy
 Pencils: Francisco Ruiz Velasco
 Galactic Year: 3 ABY
 Preceded by: Scoundrel's Wages
 Followed by: Stop that Jawa!

Nameless 

 Script: Christian Read
 Pencils: Chris Slane
 Colors: Giulia Brusco & Matt Hollingsworth
 Galactic Year: 34 BBY
 Preceded by: Jedi Chef
 Followed by: Marked

Darth Sidious questions his apprentice Darth Maul to explain the story behind his new double-bladed lightsaber.  Maul was ordered to the Jentares system by Sidious to kill the Jedi master Siolo Ur Manka. But Manka easily defeated Maul's surprise attack, using only a wooden staff.  Having fled, Maul regrouped and constructs his new weapon. In the next fight Maul surprises Manka, stabbing him through the back with the second blade.  Sidious encourages Maul to name the weapon. However, Maul does not want it to become anything more than an anonymous instrument of murder.

A Wookiee Scorned 

 Script: Jason Hall
 Pencils: Christina Chen
 Colors: Dan Jackson
 10 Pages
 Galactic Year: 4 ABY
 Preceded by: Do or Do Not
 Followed by: X-Wing: Rogue Leader

Free Memory 

 Script: Brett Matthews
 Pencils: Vatche Mavlian
 Colors: Michelle Madsen
 10 Pages
 Galactic Year: 4 ABY
 Preceded by: A Day in the Life
 Followed by: Lucky

Issue #11

Prey 

 Story & Art: Kia Asamiya
 Colors: Dave Stewart
 22 Pages
 Galactic Year: 1 BBY
 Preceded by: The Princess Leia Diaries (pages 10–12)
 Followed by: Underworld: The Yavin Vassilika

In the Beginning 

 Script: Garth Ennis
 Pencils: Amanda Connor
 Inks: Jimmy Palmiotti
 Colors: Todd Broeker
 6 Pages
 Galactic Year: 3 BBY
 Preceded by: The Flight of the Falcon
 Followed by: Droids: The Kalarba Adventures

The Princess Leia Diaries 

 Script: Jason Hall
 Pencils: Chris Brunner
 Colors: Dave Nestelle
 12 Pages
 Galactic Year: 6-1 BBY
 Preceded by: Being Boba Fett
 Followed by: Outbid but Never Outgunned

Tall Tales 

 Script: Scott Allie
 Pencils: Paul Lee & Brian Horton
 Colors: Dave Stewart
 8 Pages
 Galactic Year: 11 ABY
 Preceded by: The Other
 Followed by: Jedi Academy: Leviathan

Ghost 

 Script: Jan Duursema
 Pencils: Jan Duursema & Dave McCaig
 8 Pages
 Galactic Year: 12 BBY
 Preceded by: Separated
 Followed by: Fortune, Fate, and the Natural History of the Sarlacc

Issue #12

A Day in the Life 

 Script: Brett Matthews
 Pencils: Adrian Sibar
 Colors: Guy Major
 12 Pages
 Galactic Year: 4 ABY
 Preceded by: Sand Blasted
 Followed by: Free Memory

A Jedi's Weapon 

 Script: Henry Gilroy
 Pencils: Manuel Garcia
 Inks: Jimmy Palmiotti
 Colors: Guy Major
 12 Pages
 Galactic Year: 24 BBY
 Preceded by: The Sith in Shadow
 Followed by: Starfighter: Crossbones
 NOTE: Also given out as a Free Comic Book Day single

The Revenge of Tag and Bink 

 Script: Kevin Rubio
 Pencils: Rick Zombo
 Inks: Randy Emberlin
 Colors: Dan Brown
 10 Pages
 Galactic Year: 4 ABY
 Preceded by: Return of the Jedi
 Followed by: The Return of Tag and Bink: Special Edition

Once Bitten 

 Script: C. B. Cebulski
 Pencils: Makoto Nakatsuka
 Colors: Dave Nestelle
 10 Pages
 Galactic Year: 36 BBY
 Preceded by: Qui-Gon and Obi-Wan: The Aurorient Express
 Followed by: Children of the Force

The Duty 

 Script: Christian Read
 Pencils: John McCrea
 Inks: Jimmy Palmiotti
 Colors: Giulia Brusco
 12 Pages
 Galactic Year: 18 BBY
 Preceded by: The Path to Nowhere
 Followed by: The Value of Proper Intelligence to Any Successful Military Campaign is Not to be Underestimated

Volume 4

Issue #13 
Mace Windu is featured in each story in this issue.

Puzzle Peace 

 Script: Scott Beatty
 Pencils: Sanford Greene
 Inks: Kris Kaufman
 Colors: Dan Jackson
 8 Pages
 Galactic Year: 24 BBY
 Preceded by: Starfighter: Crossbones
 Followed by: Honor and Duty

The Secret of Tet Ami 

 Script: Fabian Nicieza
 Pencils: Timothy II
 Colors: Michelle Madsoen
 10 Pages
 Galactic Year: 43 BBY
 Preceded by: Mythology
 Followed by: Qui-Gon and Obi-Wan: The Aurorient Express

Survivors 

 Script: Jim Krueger
 Pencils: Kagan McLeod
 10 Pages
 Galactic Year: 45 BBY
 Preceded by: Stones
 Followed by: Mythology

Mace Windu has tracked down Uda-Khalid, a known murderer, and has come to confront him. The story begins with Windu's approach to the fortress where he is. The path there is a narrow bridge across a deep ravine. While he is crossing it, two guards watch his approach, debating on whether or not he is a bounty hunter, and how he could have possibly found Uda-Khalid. As he crosses, he must battle high winds and "walk worms" (large worms that come out of the sides of the middle of the bridge). The sentries lose sight of him, only to find Windu standing right behind them. Before they fire on him, he mind-tricks them into believing that their job is to guard the walls from outside intruders, and that since he is inside the walls, he couldn't be a danger.

Windu enters the main audience hall to find Uda-Khalid waiting for him. He offers to double Windu's pay, believing he is a bounty hunter, to which Windu responds that he has been paid with the story of his crimes. Uda-Khalid says that he has left no evidence of his crimes, no survivors, no witnesses. We then see hundreds if not thousands of spirits of Uda-Khalid's victims filling the hall around the two. Windu reveals that he is a Jedi Knight and ignites his lightsaber. Khalid gloats that it has been a long time since he's killed a Jedi, and the duel begins, only to be ended swiftly with a stab to Uda-Khalid's heart.

Stones 

 Script: Haden Blackman
 Pencils: Michael Zulli
 Colors: Giulia Brusco
 6 Pages
 Galactic Year: 58 BBY
 Preceded by: Vow of Justice
 Followed by: Survivors

A young Padawan named Mace Windu was sent to Hurikane to negotiate with these beings and possibly obtain some of the crystals. After events went poorly, several of the native gave chase to Windu, resulting in Mace panicking and pushing them into a canyon. Having realized the error of his ways, the young Jedi apprentice healed the being's broken body by piecing it back together with the Force. In gratitude, Mace received some of the Hurrikaine crystals from the being's body, which he used to create his purple lightsaber blade.

The Sith in Shadow 

 Script: Bob Harris
 Pencils: Jerome Opena
 Colors: Dave Nestelle
 10 Pages
 Galactic Year: 27 BBY
 Preceded by: Zam Wesell
 Followed by: A Jedi's Weapon

Children of the Force 

 Script: Jason Hall
 Pencils: Lucas Marangon
 12 Pages
 Galactic Year: 37 BBY
 Preceded by: Once Bitten
 Followed by: Qui-Gon and Obi-Wan: Last Stand on Ord Mantell

Issue #14

Apocalypse Endor 

 Script: Christian Read
 Pencils: Clayton Henry
 Inks: Jimmy Palmiotti
 Colors: Dan Jackson
 10 Pages
 Galactic Year: 19 ABY
 Preceded by: The Secret Tales of Luke's Hand!
 Followed by: Union

The Emperor's Court 

 Script: Jason Hall
 Pencils: Ramon Bachs
 Inks: Raul Fernandez
 Colors: Dave Nestelle
 8 Pages
 This story is non-canon

Urchins 

 Story & Art: Stan Sakai
 Colors: Tom Luth
 8 Pages
 Galactic Year: 33 BBY
 Preceded by: Marked
 Followed by: Jedi Council: Acts of War

Tides of Terror 

 Script: Milton Freewater Jr.
 Pencils: Adriana Melo
 Inks: Fabio Laguna
 Colors: Chris Blythe
 10 Pages
 Galactic Year: 22 BBY
 Preceded by: The Lesson
 Followed by: Sacrifice

The Lesson 

 Script: Adam Gallardo
 Pencils: Homs
 Colors: Dan Jackson
 6 Pages
 Galactic Year: 22 BBY
 Preceded by: Nobody's Perfect
 Followed by: Tides of Terror

Smuggler's Blues 

 Story & Art: The Filbach Brothers
 Colors: Jason Hvam
 4 Pages
 Galactic Year: 0 ABY
 Preceded by: Trooper
 Followed by: What Sin Loyalty?

Mythology 

 Script: Chris Eliopolous
 Pencils: Jon Sommariva
 Inks: Pierre-Andre Dery
 Colors: Darrin Moore
 10 Pages
 Galactic Year: 44 BBY
 Preceded by: Survivors
 Followed by: The Secret of Tet Ami

Issue #15

The Sandstorm 

 Script: Jason Hall
 Pencils: Sunny Lee
 Inks: Randy Emberlin
 Colors: Digital Chameleon
 12 Pages
 Galactic Year: 8 BBY
 Preceded by: Luke Skywalker: Detective
 Followed by: Number Two in the Galaxy

While braving a Tatooine sandstorm and desert creatures including a Krayt dragon, a 10-year-old Luke gains an unlikely ally - "Annie", his father Anakin as a child.

First Impressions 

 Script: Nathan Walker
 Pencils: Kilian Plunkett
 Colors: Dave Nestelle
 8 Pages
 Galactic Year: 1 BBY
 Preceded by: Boba Fett: Enemy of the Empire
 Followed by: Crucible!

Falling Star 

 Script: Jim Beard
 Pencils: Todd Nauck
 Inks: Jamie Mendoza
 Colors: Matthew Anthony
 10 Pages
 Galactic Year: 4 BBY
 Preceded by: The Princess Leia Diaries (pages 8–9)
 Followed by: Star Wars: Ewoks

A misadventure of childhood friends and future Rogue Squadron wingmen Luke and Biggs Darklighter that ensues when the two of them attempt to take off from Tatooine and experience space travel four years before they both fought in the Battle of Yavin.

Do or Do Not 

 Script: Jay Laird
 Pencils: Timothy Il
 Colors: James Mason
 4 Pages
 Galactic Year: 4 ABY
 Preceded by: Lucky
 Followed by: A Wookiee Scorned

Slippery Slope 

 Script: Scott Lobdell
 Pencils: Sean Murphy
 Colors: Dan Jackson
 8 Pages
 Galactic Year: 3 ABY
 Preceded by: Hoth
 Followed by: Thank the Maker

Lucky Stars 

 Script: Brian Augustyn
 Pencils: Paco Medina
 Inks: Joe Sanchez
 Colors: Michelle Madsen
 14 Pages
 Galactic Year: 2 ABY
 Preceded by: Planet of the Dead
 Followed by: Junkheap Hero

Leia channels her inner femme fatale while teaming up with the Quetzal Sisters, a group of Rebel operatives who are already known as such, while intercepting a holocube on Elerion that contains Rebel base information before it can be sold to the Empire.

Issue #16

The Other 

 Script: Jason Hall
 Pencils: John McCrea
 Colors: Giulia Brusco
 10 Pages
 Galactic Year: 11 ABY
 Preceded by: Hard Currency
 Followed by: Tall Tales

Best Birthday Ever 

 Script: Tod C. Parkhill
 Pencils & Colors: Joey Mason
 Inks: Howard Shum
 8 Pages
 This story is non-canon

The Long, Bad Day 

 Script: Mike Denning
 Pencils: Lucas Marangon
 2 Pages
 Galactic Year: 0 ABY
 Preceded by: Day After the Death Star
 Followed by: Sacrifice

Kessel Run 

 Story & Art: Gilbert Austin
 18 Pages
 This story is non-canon

Lunch Break 

 Story & Art: Jonathan Adams
 6 Pages
 Galactic Year: 2 ABY
 Preceded by: The Hidden
 Followed by: The Empire Strikes Back

Heart of Darkness 

 Script: Paul Lee
 Pencils: Paul Lee & Brian Horton
 12 Pages
 Galactic Year: 700 BBY
 Preceded by: Prototypes
 Followed by: Yaddle's Tale: The One Below

Volume 5

Issue #17

Planet of the Dead 

 Script: Steve Niles
 Pencils: Davidé Fabbri
 Inks: Christian Dalla Vecchia
 Colors: Sno Cone
 12 Pages
 Galactic Year: 1 ABY
 Preceded by: Tilotny Throws a Shape
 Followed by: Lucky Stars

In this possibly canon story, Han Solo and Chewbacca come into the possession of some valuable glowing Tandgor gems, that Solo claims will pay off debts and mod the Millennium Falcon. When the Falcon runs low on fuel they head for a small unnamed planet. Solo receives no lifesign readings, as if the whole planet's population disappeared.  After making planet fall, Solo and Chewbacca step out of their ship and into the fog, only for the Corellian to be confronted and overwhelmed by groaning skeletal figures; The undead. After Chewbacca fights them off they beat a hasty retreat back to the Falcon but find the fuel line has been severed. It seems someone doesn't want them to leave.  Arming themselves, the two-man crew of the Falcon head back out and come face to face with a local and her baby. She explains that the crew of a 'Great Interplanetary Ark' perished after their ship crashed in the planet's fog. They are compelled to wander the planet as corpses, terrorizing the locals every night.  Using the Tandgor Gems to lay down lines, Han forms a makeshift runway that drives away the fog. A ghostly apparition of the ship that crashed long ago uses it to land, easing the spirits of the perished crew. The living dead would no longer terrorize the planets residents.  Han and Chewie leave the planet out of pocket, but were rewarded with enough fuel to last them the rest of their journey.

All for You 

 Script: Adam Gallardo
 Pencils: Greg Titus
 Inks: Julian Washburn
 Colors: John Rauch
 10 Pages
 Galactic Year: 996 BBY
 Preceded by: Jedi vs. Sith
 Followed by: The Apprentice

This story is set 996 years before the Battle of Yavin on the planet Ceriun, where a Jedi's ship crashes near a primitive agriculture village.  Some of the adults go to inspect the crash, and the dying Jedi gives them a Sith holocron to keep safe until another Jedi can come to retrieve it.  The younger generation of the village disagree with their hiding it, and want to take it to give it to any Sith that show up looking for it, so as to get on their good side and be taken as apprentices. Two of the older men are killed in a fight that breaks out, and comes to a halt with a Sith enters and takes the holocron.  The boys confront him and tell him they did all of this for him, for the Sith, to prove themselves so he would take them with him.  He ends up cutting one boy in half, and tells them the Sith take whatever they want without anyone else's help, and rides off on his speeder

Phantom Menaces 

 Script: Joe Casey
 Pencils: Francisco Paronzini
 Colors: Dave Nestelle
 8 Pages
 Galactic Year: 5 ABY
 Preceded by: Mandatory Retirement
 Followed by: Collapsing New Empires

Ghosts of Hoth 

 Script: Rob Williams
 Pencils: Cary Nord
 Colors: Sno Cone
 8 Pages
 Galactic Year: 2 ABY
 Preceded by: Splinter of the Mind's Eye
 Followed by: A Valentine's Story: Breaking the Ice

The Apprentice 

 Script: Mike Denning
 Pencils: David Nakayama
 Inks: Greg Adams
 Colors: Peter Dawes
 6 Pages
 Galactic Year: 90-100 BBY
 Preceded by: All for You
 Followed by: Prototypes

The Sith Lord Finn and his apprentice are on an outlying world, having set off an explosion in a building. On their way back to their ship, they are stopped by Lod, a Toydarian who offers Finn Marka, his blue-haired Human slave girl. When Marka refuses to show Finn her teeth, he hits her, causing the apprentice to angrily yell at him to stop. When Lod tells Finn that he should keep a closer eye on his slave, the apprentice screams that he is not a slave, and kills Lod with his lightsaber.

Finn scolds the apprentice for showing compassion, a Jedi trait, and Marka asks to be taken with them, using a mind trick on the apprentice. Finn says that he has no need for a slave and already has an apprentice, and the two Sith leave, heading back to their ship. Finn orders the apprentice to deal with Marka as he heads to the top of the building their landing pad is on. A few minutes later the apprentice returns with Marka in tow, having been unable to kill her. Finn once more tells Marka that he already has an apprentice.

In response, Marka uses the Force to snatch the apprentice's lightsaber, then pushes him off the building to his death. Finn's only response is to ask Marka if she is coming or not.

Dark Journey 

 Script: Jason Hall
 Pencils: Ben Templesmith
 12 Pages
 Galactic Year: 22 BBY
 Preceded by: Another Fine Mess
 Followed by: Double Blind

During the Clone Wars, the Jedi Vydel Dir'Nul has ignored the call of the Jedi Council to take up a position as general. Instead, she tracks a serial killer called Kardem as vengeance for the murder of her lover, the freighter pilot Ash B'risko. Since Ash, Kardem has killed only female Twi'leks, but more disturbing is his means of killing: lightsaber and Force lightning, indicating that he is a dark Jedi. As she finds Kardem's eighth victim after following his trail of hints, a hooded figure approaches her and calls her name. They fight, but the figure disarms her and tells her he has come to take her back to the Jedi Council, but she retaliates with Force lightning. As he calls the name of Master Dir'Nul, she responds that her name is Kardem. The Jedi reveals that Dir'Nul is Kardem. She discovered Ash with a Twi'lek dancing girl, and in her rage killed him, creating the dark side mental persona of Kardem in the process. From then on, she killed female Twi'leks in the Kardem persona, then investigated the murders in the Dir'Nul persona. The Jedi tells her that he was sent to bring her back, dead or alive. Calling upon the dark side, Kardem kills him with lightning and his lightsaber. She then reverts to the Dir'Nul persona and is shocked to find that "Kardem" has claimed yet another victim, this time a Jedi. She reaffirms her vow to bring the killer to justice.

Issue #18

Number Two in the Galaxy 

 Script: Henry Gilroy
 Pencils: Todd Demong
 Colors: Jim Campbell
 10 Pages
 Galactic Year: 7 BBY
 Preceded by: The Sandstorm
 Followed by: Payback

Boba Fett comes to get his armor repaired on the remote planet of Ma'ar Shaddam. While he is not wearing it, a group of bounty hunters attempt to kill him. Dressed only in a robe, he tricks some of the hunters into killing each other. He kills another barehanded and steals the dead being's blade. The ringleader of the hunters steals Fett's Mandalorian armor and Slave I. Using the ship's cannons, he blasts the facility that Fett is in. Believing he killed Fett, he goes to a nearby cantina, impersonating him. Fett comes in wearing Jango's old armor and takes his armor back, but leaves the impersonator alive to remember who is number one.

Payback 

 Script: Andy Diggle
 Pencils: Henry Flint
 Colors: Chris Blythe
 8 Pages
 Galactic Year: 7 BBY
 Preceded by: Number Two in the Galaxy
 Followed by: Being Boba Fett

Boba Fett takes a job from Drex, a crime lord in the Gallapraxis system. It is his job to get Feleen Bantillian, dead or alive, for the fee of 50,000. Drex tells him that Bantillian had killed his son. Fett tracks him to an abandoned droid plant on Vornax, and gives him a chance to surrender. Bantillian tells Fett that he is Drex's son, and that Fett killed his brother. Drex set up Fett. Fett fires at Bantillian, who blocks the blast with an old droideka shield. Bantillian closes the roof of the area they are in. Dozens of old droids stagger towards Fett, trying to kill him. A war droid shoots him out of the sky, damaging his jetpack. Fett destroys the droid. Fett then shoots a tank of machine oil, setting Bantillian afire. The being jumps into a deep pool of water, only belatedly realizing that he cannot swim. He calls for his droids to help and all of them sink to the bottom. Fett goes back to an astonished Drex, who pays Fett reluctantly. Fett gives Drex Bantillian's head, with a thermal detonator in the mouth. As Fett leaves he mutters, "Payback doesn't pay."

Being Boba Fett 

 Script: Jason Hall
 Pencils: Stewart McKenny
 Inks: John Wycough
 Colors: Dave Nestelle
 12 Pages
 Galactic Year: 6 BBY
 Preceded by: Payback
 Followed by: The Princess Leia Diaries

The story begins with Boba Fett waking up in his home. After looking in the mirror and seeing his father's face, Boba looks for his daily bounty. After passing up escaped Wookiee slaves and high-ranking Imperial defectors, he settles for a dead-or-alive bounty named Bendu Fry. He goes into the cantina, where Fry is telling a joke to two women. As he says the punch line, Fett approaches. Fry tries to run, but Fett easily catches the fat Devaronian. To save his life, Bendu tells Fett of a Twi'lek Jedi Knight who is living on the planet. Fett leaves to track the Jedi down, and seems to locate his target. It turns out, however, the Twi'lek is not the Jedi after all, but the Jedi's son. The boy's father was killed at the Battle of Geonosis. Fett allows the boy to live and returns to cantina, disintegrating Bendu and getting his bounty.

Way of the Warrior 

 Script: Peter Alilunas
 Pencils: Will Conrad
 10 Pages
 Galactic Year: 23 BBY
 Preceded by: Honor and Duty
 Followed by: The Eyes of Revolution

On the planet Kuat a year prior to the Battle Of Geonosis, a lone cloaked figure wanders into a small colony. When the leader of the colonists, Larbo emerges to see what is happening, the young Boba Fett hurls a thermal detonator and flees into one of the tents. As Chaos ensues Jango Fett arrives to slaughter the scattered prey. When approached by two gun men, a flick Knife appears from his gauntlet and, presumably, slits their throats. He then hunts down the other Colonists.  Larbo finds Boba cowering in the corner of his tent and holds him at gunpoint to interrogate him. He is horrified to learn the young boy is the bounty hunters son. Jango, having finished assassinating the remaining members of the camp tracks down Boba and demands Larbo releases his son and slashes his way through the tents canopy. A disgusted Larbo asks what kind of man would use his own son a bait, and Boba replies "Only a son can know his father's heart". Jango seizes Boba and throws a Thermal Detonator into the tent before escaping with the boy.  Jango and Boba leave the planet in Slave I, and the Bounty Hunter confirms to Count Dooku that his mission was accomplished. The Ruling Families can now commence with building factories for the Trade Federation and the Sith Lords other allies.  On Boba's first training mission he learns an important lesson - that a warrior must suppress all emotion to succeed.

Revenants 

 Script: W. Haden Blackman
 Pencils: Dub with Niko Henrichon
 Inks: Pierre-André Déry
 Colors: Phiz
 16 Pages
 Galactic Year: 25 ABY
 Preceded by: Chewbacca
 Followed by: Equals and Opposites

Several months after Chewbacca's death, Han Solo has been convinced by his wife and Lando Calrissian to stop moping and go on a reconnaissance mission on the other side of the galaxy from Vector Prime.  Near Raxus Prime, Han's shuttle encounters Slave I and is shot down onto the junkyard moon. Keeping a log on his datapad for Leia, Han spends the next few weeks trekking across the moon, making makeshift weapons and survival gear to avoid Boba Fett, who is hunting him.  Han finally comes to the realization that there is more than one Fett following him. When that happens, he comes face to face with the real Fett. Fett reveals to Han that the entire event has been a training exercise to cull the weak recruits from the new batch of Mandalorian Protectors prior to them taking up service for the Yuuzhan Vong - since, as mercenaries, the Mandalorians go for the highest bidder, and the Yuuzhan Vong are currently the richest ones in the galaxy. The Mandalorians then take off, leaving Han behind.

Issue #19

Collapsing New Empires 

 Script: Jim Pascoe
 Pencils: Ramon Bachs
 Inks: Kris Justice
 Colors: Tom Smith
 10 Pages
 Galactic Year: 6 ABY
 Preceded by: Phantom Menaces
 Followed by: Dark Forces: Rebel Agent

The Value of Proper Intelligence to Any Successful Military Campaign is Not to be Underestimated 

 Script: Ken Lizzi
 Pencils: Lucas Marangon
 2 Pages
 Galactic Year: 18-5 BBY
 Preceded by: The Duty
 Followed by: The Destroyer

On the planet Gibbela, an agricultural planet well off any trade routes, a small Imperial contingent arrives to take control on the planet, demanding surrender from the first inhabitant they meet, a short, unassuming farmer. Much to their surprise, it transforms into a gigantic clawed beast and kills them all. The creature shrinks back to its original size and continues its fieldwork, using the remaining armor and weapons of the deceased Imperials as farm equipment.

Rather Darkness Visible 

 Script: Jeremy Barlow
 Pencils: Greg Tocchini
 Inks: Eddie Wagner
 Colors: Michael Atiyeh
 10 Pages
 Galactic Year: 21 BBY
 Preceded by: Honor Bound
 Followed by: The Battle of Jabiim

On Katanos VII, Jedi Knight Lunis and his Padawan Obs Kaj investigate intelligence that the miners of the planet are performing illegal cloning experiments. Obs Kaj has grown disillusioned with the state of affairs in the Republic and secretly plans to leave the Jedi Order after the mission.  However, when they arrive, they discover that they have walked into an ambush. The miners reveal that as profits from the cortosis mines declined, they looked to the Galactic Senate for support, but were spurned, and they began cloning operations to earn the necessary income. Their cloning attempts failed, and eventually they turned to the Confederacy of Independent Systems when they learned about the bounties that had been placed on Jedi.  As the miners attack the Jedi, Obs Kaj feels cut off in the Force from her Master, a result of her distancing herself. Lunis eventually falls and Kaj flees, escaping in a short-range shuttlepod. As she leaves the planet's surface, broadcasting a distress call, a ship makes contact with her. When it approaches, she realizes it is in fact Count Dooku, who promptly fires upon her, blowing her craft from the sky.  When Dooku later makes contact with the miners, he says he will only pay for the death of Lunis, half of what they expected and not enough to keep the mines afloat.

The Rebel Club 

 Story & Art: Scott Kurtz
 Colors: Jim Zubkavich
 8 Pages
 This story is non-canon

The Lost Lightsaber 

 Script: Andrew Robinson & Jim Royal
 Pencils: 
 Inks: Kris Justice
 Colors: Tom Smith
 8 Pages
 Galactic Year: 40 ABY
 Preceded by: Equals and Opposites
 Followed by: Broken

Into the Great Unknown 

 Script: Haden Blackman
 Pencils: Sean Murphy
 Colors: Dan Jackson
 10 Pages
 This story is non-canon

Han Solo and Chewbacca are aboard the Millennium Falcon when they are attacked by Imperials. They are forced to leap to hyperspace blind and end up in our Solar System, where they crash on Earth's Pacific Northwest. Believing they are on Endor due to the large trees, they venture out to investigate, but Han is killed by Native Americans. The mourning Chewbacca leaves the Falcon to live in the trees, where the natives believe him to be a sasquatch. One hundred and twenty-six years later, the wreckage of the Falcon and Han's remains are found by the intrepid American archaeologist Indiana Jones and his sidekick, Short Round. Indy, spooked by how "eerily familiar" the remains are, decides to leave them in peace.

Storyteller 

 Script: Jason Hall
 Pencils: Paul Lee
 8 Pages
 Galactic Year: Long after the Battle of Yavin
 Preceded by: Trust Issues

Sometime long after the Battle of Yavin, the wicked Vindar have forced their neighboring race into slavery and rule them with an iron fist. The Vindar have tortured, burned, and killed many members of the other race, thus breaking the spirits of most of the race's people—but not that of Otalp. Since he was young, his den-mother told him of the mysterious "Oracle" she saw in one of her visions. The Oracle is said to tell tales of the past to give hope for the future. Otalp's den-brother, Remoh, disagrees with this, but only travels with Otalp to escape the misery of their eternal slavery.

When they reach the cave where The Oracle is fabled to live, Remoh repeats the classic line. As they enter the cave, they come across a certain protocol droid sputtering about a tragedy that occurred when he was last deactivated. The droid says strange words, like "Ar-Too" and "Master Luke", which confuses the brothers. As soon he starts talking in an understandable language, Otalp requests a story from him. Though the droid admits to being not that good a storyteller, he decides, because Otalp and Remoh came so far, to tell them the best story he knows. The story of young boy from a desolate planet who redeemed a darkened soul and freed the galaxy from the clutches of the ultimate evil using a mythical tool known as a "lightsaber". As the droid tells this story, the two brothers imagine it all as though it were their own kind who was fighting the fights.

Just after the storyteller has concluded his tale, the Vindar blasts his head off. While Remoh hides, Otalp claims that he came alone. The Vindar kills him and leave to attend other matters. As Remoh gazes over the petrified corpse of his brother, he notices an oddly shaped metal rod poking out of the storyteller's severed torso chest. Remoh notices it has a button and pushes it. A glowing, green blade appears from the rod. Realization dawning on him, he starts to think of a way to free his desolate planet from the clutches of their ultimate evil.

Issue #20

George R. Binks 

 Story & Art: Tony Millionaire
 Colors: Jim Campbell
 10 Pages
 Galactic Year: 45 BBY
 Preceded by: Lil' Maul in: Hate Leads to Lollipops
 Followed by: Mythology

On the seas of Naboo, George R. Binks of the Binks & Son Whaling Company attempts to take down a whale. However, the irresponsibility and clumsiness of his son Jar Jar causes their ship to founder and the Binkses to be marooned on a deserted island. A month goes by, and George is driven to madness by his son's follies. When Jar Jar proposes to swim for the mainland, George eagerly agrees, knowing that he will likely not make it. However, his wife intervenes. George, unable to take any more, decides to shoot himself. When his wife tries to stop him by asking him to "Think of our son!", he pulls the trigger, which grazes his skull. As he lies there he reminisces of his love Sheebla, and how he chose not to marry her because she could not bear him the son he wanted. As he imagines seeing Sheebla standing before him, the hallucination clears to reveal that it is really Jar Jar with an octopus wrapped around his head. George's only response is crushing despair.

Who's Your Daddy 

 Story & Art: Jason
 Colors: Paul Hornschemeier
 1 Page
 This story is non-canon

Fred Jawa 

 Story & Art: Bob Fingerman
 6 Pages
 This story is non-canon

Luke Skywalker: Detective 

 Story & Art: Rick Geary
 Colors: Sno Cone
 12 Pages
 Galactic Year: 8 BBY
 Preceded by: Nerf Herder
 Followed by: The Sandstorm

Hunger Pains 

 Story & Art: Jim Campbell
 2 Pages
 Galactic Year: 3 ABY
 Preceded by: Thank the Maker
 Followed by: Blind Fury

Failing Up With Jar Jar Binks 

 Story & Art: Peter Bagge
 7 Pages
 This story is non-canon

Nobody's Perfect 

 Story & Art: Peter Bagge
 1 Page
 Galactic Year: 22 BBY
 Preceded by: Tag and Bink: Revenge of the Clone Menace
 Followed by: The Lesson

Problem Solvers 

 Story & Art: Chris Eliopoulos
 4 Pages
 Galactic Year: 6 ABY
 Preceded by: Boba Fett: Twin Engines of Destruction
 Followed by: Lando's Commandos: On Eagle's Wings

Melvin Fett 

 Story & Art: James Kochalka
 4 Pages
 This story is non-canon

Melvin Fett, cousin of the infamous Boba Fett, travels to the "desert" planet of Tatooine seeking the bounty on Jar Jar Binks, hoping to finally gain respect from other bounty hunters. As he walks under the boiling twin suns in the Tatooine dunes, he hears Jar Jar, but because he is unable to see because of the sweat stinging his eyes, he doesn't notice that it is just a Jawa drinking out of a Jar Jar Binks Commemorative Drinking Cup with flexible straw and "talking action". As he pulls out his blaster, he trips on a rock and the blaster flies out of his hands and knocks out the Jawa. Grabbing the cup, he praises himself by the capture, thinking the other bounty hunters will never laugh at him ever again.

Young Lando Calrissian 

 Story & Art: Gilbert Hernandez
 Colors: Michelle Madsen
 8 Pages
 Galactic Year: 5 BBY
 Preceded by: Routine
 Followed by: Falling Star

Volume 6

Issue #21

Nomad, Chapter one 

 Script: Rob Williams
 Pencils: Brandon Badeaux
 Colors: Dan Jackson
 22 Pages
 Galactic Year: 32 BBY
 Preceded by: Force Fiction
 Followed by: Nomad, Chapter two

A ship on a mission to return the deadly prisoner called Lycan to Coruscant crashes on the lands of Darca Nyl and he finds a dying Jedi Knight in the wreckage. The Jedi tells him of Lycan and gives Nyl his lightsaber. Nyl rushes back home and finds his son slain by Lycan, which causes Darca to pursue him.

Darca Nyl's pursuit leads him to an uninhospitable, colonized planet in the Outer Rim rich with ore, where he soon meets Samuel, the owner of the planet's mining facility. Samuel mistakes the lightsaber-wielding Nyl for a Jedi after he ends a conflict between Samuel's men and a boy accused of conspiring in the kidnapping of Samuel's daughter Leddar. Samuel reveals that Lycan has already left the planet a week earlier on a supply ship, but he asks Nyl to help return his daughter before he tells him Lycan's destination. Darca Nyl accepts the deal and ventures with Samuel outside the facility in protective suits to find Ledd. After a brief fight they managed to disarm the kidnapper and rescue Leddar. Samuel finally reveals that Lycan was heading for Molavar.

Walking the Path that's Given 

 Script: Shane McCarthy & Thomas Andrews
 Pencils: Michel Lacombe
 Inks: Serge LaPointe
 Colors: SnoCone Studios
 17 Pages
 Galactic Year: 0 ABY
 Preceded by: As Long as We Live Forever
 Followed by: Vader's Quest

Equals and Opposites 

 Script: Nathan P. Butler
 Pencils: James Raiz
 Colors: Michael Atiyeh
 14 Pages
 Galactic Year: 28 ABY
 Preceded by: Revenants
 Followed by: The Lost Lightsaber

Issue #22

Honor Bound 

 Script: Ian Edginton
 Pencils: Steve Pugh
 Colors: Michael Atiyeh
 22 Pages
 Galactic Year: 21 BBY
 Preceded by: Jedi: Dooku
 Followed by: Rather Darkness Visible

Nomad, Chapter two 

 Script: Rob Williams
 Pencils: Brandon Badeaux
 Colors: Dan Jackson
 18 Pages
 Galactic Year: 32 BBY
 Preceded by: Nomad, Chapter one
 Followed by: Nomad, Chapter three

Darca Nyl's pursuit is interrupted when the crew of the ship he is on turns against him. He manages to take care of them, but the ship crashes on an unknown planet. He soon meets a woman named Jaren and her brother Ament who he rescues from a man on a speeder bike. The siblings lie about their reason of being chased, but they tell Nyl he can find a freighter in their hometown. The following night Nyl's emotional difficulties finally catch up with him when Jaren shows him a trick: An image of his son in a campfire. Upon seeing the image he is compelled to face his feelings of guilt and rage. The next day, Ament leaves and doesn't return. Darca, while searching for Ament, finds a bear-like creature that attacks him. He ends up killing the creature with the lightsaber, but runs back to the campfire when he hears Jaren scream. Ament had returned and was killing a similar bear-like creature that threatened Jaren's life. It turned out that Ament was a murderer and that Jaren had helped him escape from prison. Ament suffered of guilty conscience and Darca Nyl took him and Jaren to the bikers who were chasing them earlier, who were able to show Nyl where he could get a ride to Molavar.

Marooned 

 Story & Art: Lucas Marangon
 14 Pages
 Galactic Year: 5 ABY
 Preceded by: Mara Jade: A Night on the Town
 Followed by: Three Against the Galaxy

Issue #23

Shadows and Light 

 Script: Joshua Ortega
 Art: Dustin Weaver
 Colors: Michael Atiyeh
 Letters: Michael Heisler
 Galactic Year: 3,993 BBY
 Preceded by: The Sith War
 Followed by: Unseen, Unheard

Nomad, Chapter three 

 Script: Rob Williams
 Pencils: Brandon Badeaux
 Colors: Dan Jackson
 18 Pages
 Galactic Year: 32 BBY
 Preceded by: Nomad, Chapter two
 Followed by: Nomad, Chapter four

On Molavar Darca Nyl continues his pursuit of Lycan, who had wreaked havoc in a local casino. Lycan had taken a ship of one of the people he killed in the casino and landed in the middle of the desert and in order to reach it Nyl joins a convoy led by a Molavaran called Tooth.

Four days later Tooth's convoy finds Lycan's ship, and Darca leaves to pursue on his own. He is soon found by a moisture farmer named Byrom, whose wife has just encountered Lycan in the desert. Byrom is troubled by a Molavaran gangster named Sleeth, whose mother is the reigning crime-lady of Malcraan. When Sleeth arrives to ask for protection money, Nyl chases them away and humiliates Sleeth. Darca wants to help defend Byrom, but Byrom insists that he continue his search for Lycan. Nyl leaves, and soon Sleeth's mother arrives to exact revenge. However, Darca returns with Tooth's convoy and Tooth forms an alliance with Byrom against Sleeth's mother. Darca leaves again in a borrowed landspeeder to pursue Lycan.

Lucky 

 Script: Rob Williams
 Pencils: Michel Lacombe
 Inks: Serge LaPointe & Andrew Pepoy
 Colors: Wil Glass
 14 Pages
 Galactic Year: 4 ABY
 Preceded by: Free Memory
 Followed by: Do or Do Not

Issue #24

Marked 

 Script: Rob Williams
 Pencils: Cully Hamner
 Colors: Wil Glass
 12 Pages
 Galactic Year: 33 BBY
 Preceded by: Nameless
 Followed by: Urchins

Darth Sidious sends Darth Maul on a mission to eliminate a certain disturbance in the Force. Sidious informs Maul that the phenomenon threatens to wake the Jedi from their complacency and inability to sense the return of the Sith.

Maul tracks his quarry to a cantina on a planet in the Outer Rim. The disturbance is in the form of a Drovian brute called Silus, who is extremely strong in the dark side of the Force. Silus is a champion competitor in a fighting sport that involves use of the Force, and the winning of credits.

When Maul enters, an Aleena called Tabor engages Silus in combat. Tabor is no match for him, and dies quickly.

Maul confronts Silus, and opens a holocommunication channel to his master. Through the holo, Sidious offers Silus an opportunity to become his new apprentice: by giving him a chance to kill Darth Maul. Maul is confused by his Master's apparent betrayal, and turns to great anger. He kills Silus without much effort. Maul later realizes that it was merely a test of his own strength, and a lesson demonstrating that in fear there is power.

Throughout the story, Maul experiences some minor flashbacks. The flashbacks reveal that Maul had plain red skin as a child, and that his Sith tattoos were applied by none other than Darth Sidious himself.

Fett Club 

 Script: Kevin Rubio
 Pencils: Roger Langridge
 Colors: Wil Glass
 11 Pages
 This story is non-canon

Unseen, Unheard 

 Script: Chris Avellone
 Pencils: Dustin Weaver
 6 Pages
 Galactic Year: 3,952 BBY
 Preceded by: Shadows and Light
 Followed by: Redemption

Nomad, Chapter four 

 Script: Rob Williams
 Pencils: Brandon Badeaux
 Colors: Dan Jackson
 24 Pages
 Galactic Year: 32 BBY
 Preceded by: Nomad, Chapter three
 Followed by: Emissaries to Malastare

See also
Star Wars Infinities
Star Wars: Visionaries

References

External links
Star Wars Tales at Wookieepedia: The Star Wars Wiki.

Ewoks
Tales
Dark Horse Comics titles
Comics anthologies